The 1971 Appalachian State Mountaineers football team was an American football team that represented Appalachian State University as an independent during the 1971 NCAA College Division football season. In their first year under head coach Jim Brakefield, the Mountaineers compiled an overall record of 7–3–1. Brakefield was hired from Wofford in January 1971 to replace Carl Messere who resigned to focus exclusively on his teaching duties.

Schedule

References

Appalachian State
Appalachian State Mountaineers football seasons
Appalachian State Mountaineers football